Salvia verbenaca, also known as wild clary or wild sage, is native to the British Isles, the Mediterranean region in Southern Europe, North Africa, and Near East, and in the Caucasus. It can be found as an introduced species that has naturalized in meadows in the Eastern United States.

S. verbenaca is a tall perennial herb with hairy stems and branches that erectly sprawl out. It has soft purple to violet flowers in mid summer. It is in flower from June to September, and the seeds ripen from July to October. The flowers are bisexual and are pollinated by bees. Some are also cleistogamous and pollinate themselves.

The plant is noted for attracting pollinators and wildlife. It prefers neutral and alkaline soils and needs full sun. This aromatic sage is used as a flavoring in foods and to make tea; the flowers can be added to salads.

Resources 
 USDA treatment -Salvia verbenaca
 Salvia verbenaca - U.K. Floral images
 R.B.Garden-Sydney: Salvia verbenaca

Databases 
 
 
 

verbenaca
Herbs
Flora of North Africa
Flora of Western Asia
Flora of Great Britain
Flora of Europe
Matorral shrubland
Garden plants of Europe
Garden plants of Africa
Garden plants of Asia
Edible plants
Plants described in 1753
Taxa named by Carl Linnaeus